Goodland is a town in Grant Township in Newton County, Indiana. The population was 1,043 at the 2010 census.

History

Goodland was laid out in 1861. The town was named from the quality of its soil. A post office has been in operation at Goodland since 1861.

The Goodland-Grant Township Public Library and McCairn-Turner House are listed on the National Register of Historic Places.

Geography

Kentland crater, a limestone quarry, is located nearby, between Goodland and Kentland.

Demographics

2010 census
As of the 2010 census, of 2010, there were 1,043 people, 426 households, and 276 families living in the town. The racial makeup of the town was 97.5% White, 0.7% African American, 0.4% Native American, 0.5% from other races, and 1.0% from two or more races. Hispanic or Latino of any race were 2.1% of the population.

There were 426 households, of which 31.0% had children under the age of 18 living with them, 46.9% were married couples living together, 10.8% had a female householder with no husband present, 7.0% had a male householder with no wife present, and 35.2% were non-families. 27.9% of all households were made up of individuals, and 13.4% had someone living alone who was 65 years of age or older. The average household size was 2.45 and the average family size was 2.99.

The median age in the town was 42.3 years. 22.7% of residents were under the age of 18; 7.7% were between the ages of 18 and 24; 23.4% were from 25 to 44; 30.1% were from 45 to 64; and 16.1% were 65 years of age or older. The gender makeup of the town was 50.2% male and 49.8% female.

Education
The town has a lending library, the Goodland-Grant Township Public Library.

Notable people
 Eddie Condon, former jazz musician and bandleader
 Joe McConnell, former sportscaster
 Marty Ravellette, armless hero
Louis Sola, Federal Maritime Commission
 Andy Zimmer, former collegiate basketball player, Indiana Hoosiers

External links

References

Towns in Indiana
Towns in Newton County, Indiana